Steven Robert Ontiveros (born October 26, 1951) is a former third baseman in Major League Baseball who played from  through  for the San Francisco Giants (1973–1976) and Chicago Cubs (1977–1980). He also played six seasons in Japan for the Seibu Lions (1980–1985). Ontiveros was a switch-hitter and threw right-handed. He is of Mexican American descent.

A solid third baseman with an average arm, Ontiveros won The Sporting News Minor League Player of the Year Award in 1973. He reached the majors with the San Francisco Giants late in the season, spending four years with them. He was traded along with Bobby Murcer and minor-league right-handed pitcher Andy Muhlstock from the Giants to the Cubs for Bill Madlock and Rob Sperring on February 11, 1977. 1977 ended up being his most productive season for the Cubs, when he posted career-highs in games played (156), batting average (.299), home runs (10), RBI (68), hits (162), and on-base percentage (.390).

On April 17, 1977, Ontiveros singled against the New York Mets' Tom Seaver, in Seaver's fifth career one-hit game.

In an eight-season career, Ontiveros was a .274 hitter with 24 home runs and 224 RBI in 732 games. Following his major league career, he played in Japan with the Seibu Lions from 1980 to 1985 and hit .312 with 82 home runs and 390 RBI.

References

External links

The Baseball Guru

Major League Baseball third basemen
San Francisco Giants players
Chicago Cubs players
Seibu Lions players
American expatriate baseball players in Japan
Baseball players from Bakersfield, California
American baseball players of Mexican descent
1951 births
Living people
St. Lucie Legends players